Camellia hengchunensis is a species of plant in the family Theaceae. It is endemic to Taiwan.

References

Endemic flora of Taiwan
hengchunensis
Taxonomy articles created by Polbot